Tofig Muhammad oglu Huseynzade  (20 September 1946 – 13 November 2006) also spelled as  Tofiq Huseynzade  was a philologist, folklorist, journalist and poet of Azerbaijan. He was a member of the Union of Journalists of the USSR (1987).

Biography 
Huseynzade was born on 20 September 1946 in Sariyagub (present-day Jaghatsadzor), a village of Basargechar district (present-day Gegharkunik Province) of the Armenian SSR.

He was admitted into the Faculty of Philology at Azerbaijan State Pedagogical University (1965–1971). Afterwards, he continued his high level of education at İnstitute of Folklore of ANAS. During the period of the Soviet Union, he had held different positions in Armenia. In 1988, during the mass deportation of Azerbaijanis from Armenia, he moved to Baku with his family and continued his activity here.

He had a close and friendly relationship with Khalil Rza Uluturk, a People's Poet of Azerbaijan SSR.

He was the father of Rafig Huseynzade who is a member of the European Association of Urology, urologist, and Doctor of Medicine; and was the brother of Rafig Huseynzade, a doctor-oncologist and poet.

Tofig Huseynzade died on 13 November 2006.

Career
From 1970, Huseynzade started to work as a teacher at a school in Barkhudarly, Qazakh District, then continued to pedagogical activity in Sariyagub, Basargechar. From November 1979 he worked as a literary worker in Basargechar district newspaper ("Vardenis"), and since November 1986 head of the agricultural department. Since 1987, he had been admitted to the membership of the Union of Journalists of the USSR. Later he worked at ANAS on philology.

Scientific activity
He has been well-known in the Azerbaijani press, TV, and radio, with various articles and poems published about the folklore of Goycha and other historical subjects, acting as a journalist in "New Azerbaijan", "Nation", "Right Way" and other newspapers.

He made researches about Miskin Abdal, a thinker in the Safavid period, and at the same time his great grandfather and in 2005 he published a book called "Safavids' Great Auliya – Miskin Abdal". In 2003, he was a PhD student at the Folklore Institute of the National Academy of Sciences. He completed his dissertation on "Poetics of Ashiq's words" in 2005, and his death did not allow him to defend his work.

In his three-dimensional book, named as "Dream Lane", Tofiq Huseynzade's poetic world, stories and scientific researching work ("Miskin Abdal – Geyb Arani, Tasawwuf Piri") which are the first scientifically substantiated findings in Azerbaijani literary regarding with the interpretation of "Miskin" and "Abdal", that describe the high divine-spiritual consciousness and rankings of the great and rich creativity, have been added.

Works
 Hüseynzadə Tofiq Məhəmməd oğlu. "Səfəvilərin böyük övliyası – Miskin Abdal", Bakı, "Şəms", 2005. 386 səh. 1000 nüsxə.
 Hüseynzadə Tofiq Məhəmməd oğlu. Aşıq deyişmələrinin poetikası: monoqrafiya / T.M.Hüseynzadə; elmi red. M.Q.Allahmanlı. — Bakı: "Gənclik", 2017. — 312 s. (arxivləşdirilib)
 Hüseynzadə Tofiq Məhəmməd oğlu. Xəyal cığırı (I cild – şeirlər), Bakı: "Zərdabi", 2018. — 600 s. (arxivləşdirilib)
 Hüseynzadə Tofiq Məhəmməd oğlu. Xəyal cığırı (II cild – şeirlər), Bakı: "Zərdabi", 2018. — 600 s.
 Hüseynzadə Tofiq Məhəmməd oğlu. Xəyal cığırı (III cild – şeirlər və "Miskin Abdal – Qeyb Ərəni, Təsəvvüf Piri" əsəri), Bakı: "Zərdabi", 2018. — 600 s.
 Hüseynzadə Tofiq Məhəmməd oğlu. "Miskin Abdal – Qeyb Ərəni, Təsəvvüf Piri", Bakı: "Zərdabi LTD", 2018. — 360 s.

Bibliography

References

1946 births
2006 deaths
Azerbaijani philologists
Azerbaijani poets
Azerbaijani journalists
Armenian Azerbaijanis
People from Gegharkunik Province
20th-century journalists
20th-century philologists